James C. MacPherson is a justice of the Court of Appeal for Ontario.

Early life and education
Born in Yarmouth, Nova Scotia, he graduated from Acadia University with a Bachelor of Arts degree and then graduated from Dalhousie Law School in 1974 with a Bachelor of Laws. He then went on to receive a Masters in Law and Diploma in Comparative Law from Cambridge University.

Legal career
He was a professor at the Faculty of Law at the University of Victoria from 1976 to 1981. In 1981, he became Director of the Constitutional Law Branch of the Department of Attorney General of Saskatchewan. From 1985 to 1988, he was Executive Legal Officer to the Supreme Court of Canada. In 1988, he was appointed Dean of Osgoode Hall Law School. In 1993, he was appointed a Justice of the Ontario Court of Justice (General Division). In 1999, he was appointed to the Court of Appeal for Ontario.

References

Justices of the Court of Appeal for Ontario
Acadia University alumni
Schulich School of Law alumni
People from Yarmouth County
Alumni of the University of Cambridge
Academic staff of the University of Victoria
Living people
Year of birth missing (living people)